Sami Anttila (born 8 February 1995) is a Finnish ice hockey forward currently playing for Oulun Kärpät of the Finnish Liiga.

References

External links
 

1995 births
Living people
Oulun Kärpät players
Finnish ice hockey forwards
Sportspeople from Oulu